Jakub Legierski is a Polish footballer who last played as a centre forward for Tempo Puńców.

References

External links
 
 

1994 births
Living people
Polish footballers
Polish expatriate footballers
Association football forwards
MFK Karviná players
FC Hlučín players
MKS Kluczbork players
Sportspeople from Silesian Voivodeship
People from Cieszyn
Polish expatriate sportspeople in the Czech Republic
Polish expatriate sportspeople in Spain
Expatriate footballers in the Czech Republic
Expatriate footballers in Spain